Caleb Crone (29 November 1919 – 8 January 1958) was an Irish Gaelic footballer who played as a left corner-back for club sides Air Corps and St Mary's, Saggart and was a member of the Dublin and Cork senior football teams from 1941 until 1948.

Career

Crone first came to Gaelic football prominence playing with the Air Corps club before linking up with St. Mary's in Saggart. He joined the Dublin senior football team in late 1941 before lining out in the 1942 All-Ireland final which saw Dublin claim their first title in 19 years after a 1-10 to 1-08 defeat of Galway. Crone later transferred to the Cork senior football team and collected a second winners' medal after their 2-05 to 0-07 win over Cavan. As a member of the Leinster and Munster inter-provincial teams at various times, he won two Railway Cup medals. Crone was posthumously named on the Cork Team of the Century.

Personal life and death

Born in Rochestown, County Cork, Crone spent much of his youth in Killavullen where his father worked as the station master. He was educated at Sullivan's Quay national school and the Patrician Academy in Mallow. Crone joined the Air Corps in 1937. After his apprenticeship he temporarily transferred to Cork and retired from the Air Corps with the rank of Sergeant. Crone subsequently joined Aer Lingus where he worked as a technician in the simulator training department. Crone married Annie McDermott in Saggart on 6 June 1945 and they had two sons.

Crone died on 8 January 1958. At just 38 years of age, he was the second member of the 1945 All-Ireland-winning team to die.

Honours

Dublin
All-Ireland Senior Football Championship: 1942
Munster Senior Football Championship: 1941, 1942

Cork
All-Ireland Senior Football Championship: 1945
Munster Senior Football Championship: 1945

Leinster
Railway Cup: 1944

Munster
Railway Cup: 1946

References

1919 births
1958 deaths
St Mary's (Dublin) Gaelic footballers
Dublin inter-county Gaelic footballers
Cork inter-county Gaelic footballers
Munster inter-provincial Gaelic footballers
Leinster inter-provincial Gaelic footballers
Gaelic football backs